Eudistoma fragum is a species of sea squirt in the class Ascidiacea. The scientific name of the species was first validly published in 1988 by Françoise Monniot.

See also
5-Bromo-DMT
Hallucinogenic fish

References

Enterogona
Aplousobranchia
Animals described in 1988